Tricholomaolivaceobrunneum  is a mushroom of the agaric genus Tricholoma. It was formally described in 1986.

See also
List of North American Tricholoma
List of Tricholoma species

References

olivaceobrunneum
Fungi described in 1986
Fungi of North America